Mohammad Saifuddin (born 1 November 1996) is a Bangladeshi cricketer. In December 2015, he was named in Bangladesh's squad for the 2016 Under-19 Cricket World Cup. He made his international debut for Bangladesh in October 2017.

Domestic career
Saifuddin made his Twenty20 (T20) debut on 13 November 2016 playing for Comilla Victorians in the 2016–17 Bangladesh Premier League.

Saifuddin was the leading wicket-taker for Shinepukur Cricket Club in the 2017–18 Dhaka Premier Division Cricket League, with 14 dismissals in 10 matches.

In April 2018, Saifuddin scored his maiden century in first-class cricket, scoring 100 not out for East Zone in the final round of the 2017–18 Bangladesh Cricket League.

In October 2018, Saifuddin was named in the squad for the Comilla Victorians team, following the draft for the 2018–19 Bangladesh Premier League. He was the leading wicket-taker for Abahani Limited in the 2018–19 Dhaka Premier Division Cricket League tournament, with 25 dismissals in 13 matches.

Saifuddin played for Minister Group Rajshahi in 2020-21 Bangabandhu T20 Cup.

International career
In April 2017, Saifuddin was named in Bangladesh's Twenty20 International (T20I) squad for their series against Sri Lanka. He made his T20I debut for Bangladesh against Sri Lanka on 4 April 2017. In October 2017, he was named in Bangladesh's One Day International (ODI) squad for their series against South Africa. On 15 October 2017, he made his ODI debut against South Africa for Bangladesh at Kimberley.

In April 2019, Saifuddin was named in Bangladesh's squad for the 2019 Cricket World Cup. In September 2021, he was named in Bangladesh's squad for the 2021 ICC Men's T20 World Cup. However, on 26 October 2021, he was ruled out of the rest of the tournament, after suffering a back injury.

References

External links
 

1996 births
Living people
Bangladeshi cricketers
Bangladesh One Day International cricketers
Bangladesh Twenty20 International cricketers
Cricket Coaching School cricketers
Chittagong Division cricketers
Bangladesh East Zone cricketers
Abahani Limited cricketers
Comilla Victorians cricketers
Shinepukur Cricket Club cricketers
People from Feni District